Lawrence Edward Carter, Sr. is an American historian, professor, author, and civil rights expert. He is Professor of Religion, College Archivist and Curator at Morehouse College as well as the Dean of the Martin Luther King Jr. International Chapel at Morehouse. Carter is also the founder of the Martin Luther King Jr. Chapel Assistants Pre-seminarians Program, and director of the Martin Luther King Jr. College of Pastoral Leadership.

Early life and education 
Carter was born in Dawson, Georgia to John and Bernice Carter. He grew up in Columbus, Ohio eventually receiving his B.A. in Social Science and Psychology from Virginia University of Lynchburg and his M. Div., S.T.M., and Ph.D. degrees from Boston University.

Career 
After graduating from Boston University, Carter served as Associate Dean of Daniel L. Marsh Chapel at Boston University. Carter later taught at Harvard University Divinity School and served as coordinator of African American studies at Simmons College.

At Morehouse College, Carter founded the Martin Luther King Jr. Chapel Assistants Pre-seminarians Program. He commissioned the Gandhi, King, Ikeda Institute for Ethics and Reconciliation in 1999, and created the Gandhi-King-Ikeda Community Builder’s Prize of the Morehouse Chapel in 2001. He also founded Morehouse College's International Hall of Honor and solicited a gift from the National Baptist Convention of $100,000 to erect the only statue in the state of Georgia of Martin Luther King Jr. He is currently Dean of the Martin Luther King Jr. International Chapter at Morehouse.

Personal life 
Carter is married to Marva Griffin Carter, Associate Professor of Music History, Popular Music, and World Music at Georgia State University. They have one son, Lawrence Edward Carter Jr.

Awards and honors 
Carter has received four honorary degrees from the following three schools: Lincoln University, Al al-Bayt University, and Soka University of Japan. He has received the following awards:
 Seikyo Award for Highest Honor 
 Trumpet Award for Spirituality.
 National Endowment for the Humanities Fellow (x2)
 Fulbright-Hayes Scholar

Select works 
 Centennial Festschrift, honoring Benjamin Elijah Mays
Walking Integrity: Benjamin Elijah Mays as Mentor to Martin Luther King, Jr. 
 Global Ethical Options, in the Tradition of Mahatma Gandhi, Martin Luther King, Jr., and Daisaku Ikeda (2001)
Being Peace, The Thing Itself- In the Tradition of Gandhi, King and Ikeda
 The Baptist Preacher's Buddhist Teacher: How My Interfaith Journey With Daisaku Ikeda Made Me A Better Christian

See also 
 List of civil rights leaders
 List of peace activists
 Post–civil rights era in African-American history

References

External links
 Biography at morehouse.edu

Year of birth missing (living people)
Living people
21st-century American historians
21st-century American male writers
Morehouse College faculty
Harvard Divinity School faculty
Simmons University faculty
Virginia University of Lynchburg alumni
Boston University School of Theology alumni
American male non-fiction writers